, literally translated "Germans of the ", is an archaic term for those ethnic Germans who resided within the German state that was founded in 1871.

Term
There are, in that sense, no general legal or "right" definitions, although during the 20th century, all terms acquired legal — yet also changing — definitions.

The reason for the differentiation is that there has been a historical shift in the meaning of what belonging to a nation means. Until the early 19th century, a demonym such as "German" — apart from the  vernacular — was not too meaningful, although at least since the German Campaign of the Napoleonic Wars, the concept certainly existed. If anything, it was more seen as a cultural concept.

With the 1871 unification of Germany under Prussian leadership, the concept of the German people first acquired a legal-political meaning, which they have retained until now. However, the German Empire as a "Lesser German" answer to the German Question, did not encompass more than two thirds of the German  (language area). For someone who considered themselves German but living abroad, e.g., in multi-ethnic Austria-Hungary,  meant any German who was a citizen of the German , as opposed to someone living abroad (and usually without a German passport). Part of the identity of ethnic German minorities living abroad — a classic example are the Baltic Germans — was to define themselves as German, using the pre-1871 concept. However,  visiting the Russian Baltic governorates in the late 19th century, for instance, resented the claims of the Baltic Germans to be German — for the Germans from the Reich, to be German meant to be a German citizen, while for the Baltic Germans, it meant cultural-historical belonging.

It was however not until the German nationality law of 1913 finally established the citizenship of the German Reich, whereas earlier political rights (including the claim to receive identity papers and passports) derived from one's citizenship of one of the States of the German Empire. The citizens of some German states comprised also autochthonous or immigrant ethnic minorities of other than German ethnicity, which is why citizens of the German Empire always also comprised people of other ethnicity than the German (e.g. Danish, French, Frisian, Polish, Romani, Sorbian etc.). German citizenship is passed on from parent to child whatever their ethnicity is. With naturalisation of aliens as German citizens, however, their eventual German ethnicity formed or still forms an advantage under certain circumstances (see ).

German citizens "of German or congeneric blood". As a result, Jews and "" officially became second-class citizens.

German people
Ethnonyms